Castlemaine may mean:
 Castlemaine, Victoria, a town in Victoria, Australia
 Castlemaine Football Club, an Australian rules football club
 Castlemaine railway station
 Castlemaine, County Kerry, a town in Ireland
 Castlemaine Brewery, Western Australia - ceased trading in 1927
 Castlemaine Perkins, a Queensland-based brewery, known for the XXXX range of beers
 Baron Castlemaine, in the peerage of Ireland
 Roger Palmer, 1st Earl of Castlemaine
 Barbara Palmer, 1st Duchess of Cleveland, wife of Roger Palmer
 HMAS Castlemaine, a ship in the Royal Australian Navy